Mošorin is a village located in the Titel municipality, South Bačka District, Vojvodina, Serbia. The village has a Serb ethnic majority and its population numbering 2,569 people (as of 2011 census).

History

The village was first time mentioned in the 16th century. During the Ottoman rule (16th-17th century), it was populated by ethnic Serbs. Since 1699, it was under Habsburg rule and was part of the Habsburg Military Frontier (Šajkaš Battalion). In 1848-1849, Mošorin was part of the Serbian Vojvodina, a Serb autonomous region within Austrian Empire, but since 1849, it is again part of the Military Frontier, until 1873 when it was included into Bačka-Bodrog county.

Since 1918, Mošorin is part of the Kingdom of Serbs, Croats and Slovenes (later known as Yugoslavia). Between 1918 and 1922 it was part of Bačka county, between 1922 and 1929 part of Belgrade oblast, and between 1929 and 1941 part of the Danube Banovina.

In 1941, the village was occupied by Axis troops and attached to Horthy's Hungary. In the 1942 raid, performed on Orthodox Christmas, the Hungarian troops killed 205 villagers, including 94 men, 41 women, 44 children and 26 old persons, of whom 170 were Serbs, 34 Romani, and 1 Hungarian. Part of the corpses of the killed villagers was thrown into the iced waters of the river Tisa, while other part was buried into four mass graves.

Axis occupation ended in 1944. Since then Mošorin was part of the new Socialist Yugoslavia. Between 1992 and 2003 it was part of the Federal Republic of Yugoslavia, between 2003 and 2006 part of Serbia and Montenegro, and since 2006, it is part of an independent Serbia.

Demographics

As of 2011 census, the village of Mošorin has a population of 2,569 inhabitants.

Famous people from Mošorin

 Svetozar Miletić (1826–1901), the political leader of Serbs in Vojvodina.
 Isidora Sekulić (1877–1958), a famous Serb literate, academician.
 Dušan Kanazir (1921–2009),  a Serbian molecular biologist
 Mladen Dražetin (1951–2015), doctor of social sciences, intellectual, economist, theatrical creator, poet, writer and philosopher. He was born and died in Novi Sad, but spent part of his childhood in Mošorin, from where his father Rada originated.
 Milan Radin (1991–), football player.

Family names of the villagers
Some prominent families in the village include: Bačkalić, Banjac, Bedov, Bugarin, Vlaškalić, Dimitrov, Dražeta, Dudarin, Đurđević, Etinski, Jelovac, Jovanović, Jurišin, Kanazir, Karanov, Kirćan, Kozarev, Kolarić
, Krunić, Kuruca, Maletin, Marjanov, Marić, Miletić, Milnović, Mirosavljev, Pantelemonov, Petakov, Požarev, Rakić, Ranisavljev, Savin, Svirčev, Sekulić, Stanojev, Subotin, Suzić, Tubić, Nestorović, Ivanović, etc.

See also
 Šajkaška
 South Bačka District
 Bačka
 List of places in Serbia
 List of cities, towns and villages in Vojvodina

References
 Slobodan Ćurčić, Broj stanovnika Vojvodine, Novi Sad, 1996.

External links

 Place index - Mošorin
 Šta se to čudno zbiva u Mošorinu

Places in Bačka
South Bačka District